Cohasset (formerly, Keefers Ridge and North Point) is a census-designated place in Butte County, California, United States, approximately  NNE of Chico, California. Its main street is named Cohasset Road, which comes from the Algonquian Indian language and  means "long rocky place".  The population was 847 at the 2010 census.

It sits on Cohasset Ridge: an eleven-mile (18 km) ridge running roughly southwest-to-northeast. The ZIP Code for the community is 95973, which is shared with about seven other nearby towns, and the area code 530.

The primary airport is the Chico Municipal Airport.

History

In the mid-19th century the local lumber and farming operations began, prior to which the Maidu inhabited the area for many generations. By the early 20th century, Cohasset was famous for its high quality apples. Today, they are better known for peaceful country living, the Annual Cohasset Bazaar, and the beauty of the Cohasset Ridge.  A post office operated at Cohasset from 1888 to 1920. The early lumbermen designated the ridge after the pineries. A school district was formed July 16, 1878 to provide a place of learning for the children of the growing number of pioneer families and was given the name of North Point District. The entire ridge came to be known by the name of North Point. In 1887 the ridge residents requested the United States Government to establish a post office there, to be named North Point. The Post Office Department concurred in the need of a postal facility but balked at the requested name. There were already too many stations in the country with either North or Point in their names so it was requested that another name be selected. For a name selecting committee two young ladies of the ridge, Miss Marie Wilson and Miss Electa Welch (the school teacher) were appointed and they chose the name Cohasset, meaning "City of Pines" in the Algonquin Indian language. There was a precedent for this in Cohasset, Massachusetts, a charming resort town of pines and rocks located on the seacoast southeast of Boston. The new name was satisfactory and the first Cohasset, California post office was established February 20, 1888

Demographics

The 2010 United States Census reported that Cohasset had a population of 847. The racial makeup of Cohasset was 764 (90.2%) White, 8 (0.9%) African American, 14 (1.7%) Native American, 2 (0.2%) Asian, 1 (0.1%) Pacific Islander, 20 (2.4%) from other races, and 38 (4.5%) from two or more races. Hispanic or Latino of any race were 43 persons (5.1%).

The Census reported that 847 people (100% of the population) lived in households, 0 (0%) lived in non-institutionalized group quarters, and 0 (0%) were institutionalized.

There were 355 households, out of which 98 (27.6%) had children under the age of 18 living in them, 188 (53.0%) were opposite-sex married couples living together, 22 (6.2%) had a female householder with no husband present, 25 (7.0%) had a male householder with no wife present.  There were 21 (5.9%) unmarried opposite-sex partnerships, and 2 (0.6%) same-sex married couples or partnerships. 96 households (27.0%) were made up of individuals, and 32 (9.0%) had someone living alone who was 65 years of age or older. The average household size was 2.39.  There were 235 families (66.2% of all households); the average family size was 2.86.

The population was spread out, with 178 people (21.0%) under the age of 18, 42 people (5.0%) aged 18 to 24, 198 people (23.4%) aged 25 to 44, 321 people (37.9%) aged 45 to 64, and 108 people (12.8%) who were 65 years of age or older.  The median age was 45.5 years. For every 100 females, there were 111.8 males.  For every 100 females age 18 and over, there were 111.7 males.

There were 408 housing units at an average density of 16.1 per square mile (6.2/km), of which 355 were occupied, of which 292 (82.3%) were owner-occupied, and 63 (17.7%) were occupied by renters. The homeowner vacancy rate was 0.7%; the rental vacancy rate was 4.5%.  684 people (80.8% of the population) lived in owner-occupied housing units and 163 people (19.2%) lived in rental housing units.

Government

State 

Federal

Climate
According to the Köppen Climate Classification system, Cohasset has a warm-summer Mediterranean climate, abbreviated "Csa" on climate maps.

References 

 US Geological Survey, National Geographic Names Database.
 Map: Cohasset, California, 7.5 minute quadrangle, 1995, US Geological Survey.
 US Census Bureau, 2000 census statistical area records.

Census-designated places in Butte County, California
Census-designated places in California